The Apostolic Nunciature to Luxembourg is an ecclesiastical office of the Catholic Church in Luxembourg. It is a diplomatic post of the Holy See, whose representative is called the Apostolic Nuncio with the rank of an ambassador. The title Apostolic Nuncio to Luxembourg is held by the prelate appointed Apostolic Nuncio to Belgium; he resides in Brussels.

Pope Leo XIII established the Apostolic Internunciature to Luxembourg in January 1891
and Pope Pius XII raised it to the status of Apostolic Nunciature to Luxembourg on 24 October 1955.

Papal representatives to Luxembourg 
Apostolic Internuncios
Appointments before 1946 are not well documented.
Fernando Cento (9 March 1946 – 26 October 1953)
Efrem Forni (9 November 1953 – 19 March 1962)
Apostolic Nuncios 
Silvio Oddi (17 May 1962 – 28 April 1969)
Igino Eugenio Cardinale (9 May 1969 – 24 March 1983)
Angelo Pedroni (6 July 1983 – 13 June 1989)
Giovanni Moretti (15 July 1989 – 3 March 1999)
Pier Luigi Celata (3 March 1999 – 14 November 2002)
Karl-Josef Rauber (22 February 2003 – 24 July 2009)
Giacinto Berloco (24 July 2009 – September 2016)
Augustine Kasujja (7 December 2016 – 31 August 2021)
Franco Coppola (14 December 2021 – present)

Notes

References

Luxembourg